Kolno  is a village in Olsztyn County, Warmian-Masurian Voivodeship, in northern Poland. It is the seat of the gmina (administrative district) called Gmina Kolno. It is located in Warmia.

The village has a population of 590.

Notable residents
 Josef Felix Pompeckj (1867–1930), German paleontologist and geologist

References

Kolno